Daphne and the Pirate is a 1916 American drama film directed by  Christy Cabanne and starring Lillian Gish.

Cast
 Lillian Gish as Daphne La Tour
 Elliott Dexter as Philip de Mornay
 Walter Long as Jamie d'Arcy
 Howard Gaye as Prince Henri
 Lucille Young as Fanchette
 Richard Cummings as Francois La Tour
 Jack Cosgrave as Duc de Mornay
 Joseph Singleton
 George C. Pearce (as George Pearce)
 W. E. Lawrence
 Pearl Elmore
 Jewel Carmen (as Jewell Carman)

See also
 Lillian Gish filmography

References

External links

1916 films
1916 drama films
American silent feature films
American black-and-white films
Films directed by Christy Cabanne
American adventure drama films
Pirate films
1910s American films
Silent American drama films
Silent adventure drama films
1910s adventure drama films